The 2015 Naisten Liiga, part of the 2015 Finnish football season, was the 9th season of Naisten Liiga since its establishment in 2007. The season started on 18 April 2015 and ended on 10 October 2015. Tikkurilan Palloseura was promoted.

The season featured 10 teams. After 18 matches played, the league was divided to Championship Group of six and Relegation Group of four. PK-35 Vantaa were the 2014 season champions and successfully defended their title and qualified for the first qualifying round of the 2016–17 UEFA Women's Champions League. Merilappi United was relegated to the Naisten Ykkönen for the 2016 season.

Teams

Format
Teams played each other twice, after that the top six teams formed a championship group and the bottom four a relegation group. At the championship group teams played each other once more while at the relegation group, teams played each other twice.

Regular season
The regular season had a total of 18 matches per club.

League table

Results

Final stage
Points and goals of the final stage are just added to the regular season.

Championship Group

Relegation Group

Top scorers 

As of matches played on 10 October 2015.

References

External links 
2015 Naisten Liiga Finnish Football Association
Season at soccerway.com

Kansallinen Liiga seasons
Naisten
Finland
Finland
Naisten